Clinton Charls Sparks (born September 18, 1975) is an American DJ, record producer, songwriter and singer from Boston, Massachusetts. He initially started his career as a rapper, dancer, producer, and DJ who gained notoriety by making bootleg remixes and mixtapes and parlayed that into hosting radio shows on Boston's Hot 97.7, Baltimore's 92Q, Hartford's Hot 93.7, and Sirius XM's Shade 45 (among others). He was the long-time host of a worldwide syndicated radio show called SmashTime Radio (also referred to as Get Familiar with Clinton Sparks). He is the current host and owner of the national hip hop radio station Get Familiar Radio on Dash Radio, a digital radio platform for which he served as vice president from 2016 to 2019.

In 2012, he was nominated for a Grammy for his production work on Lady Gaga's Born This Way. That year, he also won a BMI songwriting award for writing Pitbull's "Shut It Down" and has since won several ASCAP Awards with DJ Snake as part of his Get Familiar Music publishing company. He has written and produced songs for a number of notable acts, including Akon, Ludacris, 2 Chainz, Ty Dolla Sign, Lil Uzi Vert, Big Sean, and numerous others. Sparks has also made music of his own, including the 2005 album, Maybe You Been Brainwashed, and the 2014 EP, ICONoclast. He was featured on the song "Saturday Night," which was featured on the soundtrack for the 2016 stand-up comedy film, Kevin Hart: What Now?.

Additionally, Sparks co-founded the mixtape database, MixUnit.com; served as music correspondent for the E! series, The Daily 10 and E! News; and has held executive positions at a variety of companies including Karmaloop, FaZe Clan, Islide, PingTank, IC Realtech, and Dash Radio. In July 2020, Sparks co-founded and became the chief business development officer of the newly formed XSET, an esports and lifestyle gaming organization. He also hosts the Twitch show, Win Big with Clinton Sparks, and authored his first book, How to Win Big in the Music Business, in 2020.

Early life and education

Sparks was born and raised largely in the Dorchester neighborhood of Boston, Massachusetts. His parents got divorced when he was around 4 years old, and he lived with his mother for most of his childhood. He began using his mother's stereo as a turntable at age 10 and began manipulating his favorite parts of recordings to create new songs. When he was 12, he stole his first set of actual turntables and started making music for his groups and local artists. Sparks was a rapper and a dancer who, with his entourage, would win local talent shows.

Around that time, he and his mother moved to the Hyde Park neighborhood in Boston. Run-ins with the law throughout his youth prompted his mother to send him to live with his father in Jr high school, who struggled with alcoholism, in Randolph, Massachusetts. He graduated from Randolph High School.

After high school at age 19, he got a job with UPS and moved back to Dorchester. Eventually, he moved back in to his mother's home and built a recording studio in her basement where he would make original mixtapes and travel up and down the East Coast to hand them out. An injury sustained while working for UPS required Sparks to undergo spinal surgery, severely limiting his ability to perform manual labor. He began focusing more earnestly on music in the aftermath.

Career

1999–2005: Career beginnings with mixtapes, radio shows, and first album

From his basement studio at his mother's house, Sparks was able to convince major record labels that he ran a successful online radio show. Around the year 2000, he conducted interviews there with acts like Eminem, Common, Sean Kingston, Talib Kweli, the Wu-Tang Clan, Mobb Deep, the Clipse, and others. He ran the interviews on the radio station where he worked, Boston's Hot 97.7. Sparks was also able to accumulate freestyle raps and performances (usually over his own beats) from these artists that he would put into mixtapes. In 2002, he won the award for New Mixtape DJ of the Year at the Justo Mixtape Awards. By 2004, Sparks was hosting weekly radio shows on Hot 97.7, Baltimore's 92Q, and Hartford, Connecticut's Hot 93.7. He also hosted a syndicated hip hop show, SmashTime Radio, through SupeRadio that aired in 40 cities. That year, he was also named the Radio DJ of the Year at the Mixshow Power Summit Awards.

Also in 2004, Sparks co-founded MixUnit.com, an online mixtape marketplace that ultimately became one of the largest hubs for mixtapes on the internet. He often released his own mixtapes and bootlegs on the site, including a series dubbed SmashTime Blends and several Get Familiar volumes. Acts featured on his tapes have included, The Game, Snoop Dogg, Destiny's Child, T.I., Usher, Ciara, Fat Joe, Cam'ron, Kanye West, Jim Jones, Amerie, Ashanti, Ja Rule, Fabolous, and numerous others. The site helped mixtape DJs like DJ Drama and DJ Khaled accumulate a following. In 2005, Sparks produced the Re-Up Gang's We Got It 4 Cheap mixtapes (both Volume 1 and Volume 2). The Re-Up Gang was composed of both members of the Clipse (Pusha T and No Malice) and two other rappers (Ab-Liva and Sandman). Volume 2 is widely considered a classic, and it also popularized Sparks' vision of the "mixtape-as-album" format.

That year, Sparks began hosting a show on Eminem's Sirius satellite radio channel, Shade 45, and added another weekly show in North Carolina. He also produced The Notorious B.I.G.'s song "Hold Ya Head" featuring Bob Marley off Biggie's posthumous final studio album, Duets: The Final Chapter. In April 2005, Sparks released his own studio album, Maybe You Been Brainwashed, on Koch Records. The lead single, "Run This City," featured P. Diddy and Miri Ben-Ari. Other featured acts on the album included Busta Rhymes, Kardinal Offishall, Jadakiss, Mobb Deep, the Clipse, and others.

2006–2010: Worldwide syndication, The Daily 10 on E!, and further production work

In March 2006, Sparks signed a worldwide syndication deal with SupeRadio that took his SmashTime Radio show to Canada, Australia, and Europe. Later that year, he was named a member of the Pepsi DJ Division, a group of DJs who would serve as brand ambassadors and influencers for the company. In October 2006, he was named Diddy's official tour DJ for his Press Play tour. The two also released an accompanying mixtape entitled Don't Call It A Comeback. In 2007, Sparks produced, co-wrote, and provided vocals for the Akon song, "Sorry, Blame It on Me," which would eventually be certified platinum.

Also in 2007, he was hired by Ben Lyons to become a music correspondent for the E! network series, The Daily 10 and E! News. He also began hosting a weekly "SmashTime Party" presented by E! at the Las Vegas nightclub, Body English located inside the Hard Rock Hotel and Casino. In 2008, he provided production work on Ludacris' "Call Up The Homies" and on the Colby O'Donis album, Colby O. He also co-wrote Beyoncé's "Forever to Bleed" (originally titled "Inevitably"). The song was supposed to appear on her album, I Am... Sasha Fierce, but was kept off after it leaked on the internet.

In 2009, he was featured alongside Jadakiss and Diddy on the Chester French song, "Cîroc Star," becoming an official brand ambassador for the vodka. He would also enter into a promotional partnership with Boston-based online apparel retailer, Karmaloop, a company for which he served as director of marketing from 2010 to 2014. Sparks continued writing and producing songs in 2009, including Pitbull's "Shut It Down," for which he won a BMI Songwriting Award. He also worked with T-Pain and Leighton Meester and moved his weekly Las Vegas DJ sets to the newly-opened Vanity nightclub in the Hard Rock Hotel. In 2010, Sparks released his first single as lead vocalist entitled "Favorite DJ" featuring DJ Class and Jermaine Dupri. The song was featured on the video game, DJ Hero 2.

2011–2014: New focus as recording artist and ICONoclast

In 2011, he released the single "Sucks to be You" featuring JoJo and LMFAO, started a new weekly residency ("My Awesome Party") at the Moon nightclub in the Palms Casino Resort, and released a new series of mixtapes entitled, My Awesome Mixtape, which featured an introduction from Samuel L. Jackson. He also signed a record deal with Interscope Records and changed the name of his syndicated radio show to My Awesome Radio Show. At the grand opening of his "Awesome Party," Sparks made his entrance by being lowered from a helicopter through the retractable roof of the hotel onto his DJ set. In 2012, he began working on an album with his band, UGHmerica. He also released the song "Watch You" featuring Pitbull on the Strictly Rhythm record label. He received his first Grammy nomination for his production work on Lady Gaga's "Bloody Mary" which appeared on the album, Born This Way.

In 2013, he filmed a music video for his song "Boston Bass" (a bootleg remix of the Dropkick Murphys song, "I'm Shipping Up to Boston") at a Dorchester boxing club. In May of that year, he also released the single, "Gold Rush," featuring 2 Chainz, Macklemore, and D. A. Wallach. The song was accompanied by two videos: an actual video featuring the artists and a spoof "1849 Edition" featuring actors Nick Swardson and Simon Rex. It was the first song he had released after signing to Photo Finish/Island Def Jam. Later that year, he was featured with Teddy Riley on the Bad Rabbits song, "Dance With You," and released another original song, "Turnt Up" featuring RiFF RAFF, 2 Chainz, and Waka Flocka Flame.

In March 2014, he launched a new monthly event called "The Greatest Party On Earth" at the 1 OAK Nightclub in The Mirage. In early 2014, he released the song "Stay With You Tonight" again featuring RiFF RAFF and Lil Debbie. He followed that up with releases of "Shut Up and Go" and "Geronimo" featuring Sage the Gemini, T-Pain, and Ty Dolla Sign before releasing his debut major label EP, ICONoclast, on September 9, 2014. He also went on a mini-tour in support of the album. The EP featured six songs, including the aforementioned "Gold Rush" and "Geronimo" along with "UV Love" featuring T.I. During this time, Sparks also served as the Head of Entertainment for the online custom slide retailer, Islide.

2015–present: Business ventures, new singles, and Dash Radio

In March 2015, Sparks was named president of PingTank, a tech startup with an app that created animations to layer over photos and videos. He left that company in June to become the CCO and creative director of IC Realtech, a security and surveillance solutions company. In July 2015, he opened a club called "blue" in Marina Bay. He also formed the music publishing company, Get Familiar Music. He is credited with discovering and signing French DJ and producer, DJ Snake, who has won several ASCAP Pop Awards with songs published by Get Familiar. Other acts Sparks has discovered and signed include Tchami, Joey Bandz, and pineappleCITI. In August 2016, he and Joey Bandz were featured on the Chocolate Droppa (Kevin Hart's musical pseudonym) song "Saturday Night". The song would eventually be featured on the soundtrack for the stand-up comedy film, Kevin Hart: What Now?.

In 2017, Sparks began his own branded party ("Get Familiar Fridays") and residency at Club Shrine inside the Foxwoods Resort Casino in Connecticut. In June of that year, Sparks announced that he would start his own station and weekly radio show, Clinton Sparks Radio, on the digital radio platform, Dash Radio. The show and station were later renamed Get Familiar Radio. In September 2017, pineappleCITI—an artist Sparks manages and is credited with discovering—released her self-titled album that featured the Sparks-produced track, "Check On You," which also appeared on her February 2019 studio album, neonBLUE. In October 2017, Sparks released a new single, "Hit My Line," featuring Joey Bandz. In September, he released the single "Think About You" featuring Marc E. Bassy. In 2016, he was named the vice president of business development at Dash Radio and helped the company close an $8.8-million funding round in 2018.

In 2018, Sparks began serving as the director of business development for the esports team, FaZe Clan. As part of his work with FaZe Clan, Sparks helped bring hip hop stars like Yo Gotti, DJ Paul, Pitbull, Swae Lee, and Offset into the esports and gaming sphere as investors and participants. In July 2020, he left FaZe Clan to become the chief business development officer at XSET, a separate gaming organization that he co-founded with Greg Selkoe, Wil Eddins, and Marco Mereu. With XSET, he is responsible for recruiting artists as investors and ambassadors. Swae Lee became the first artist to invest in the company in October 2020.

Also in October 2020, he started a music and business show on Twitch called Win Big with Clinton Sparks. He released his first book, How to Win Big in the Music Business, which features a foreword by Daymond John. The book was originally given away for free as an ebook on its website. In January 2021, Sparks joined Esports Technologies as a strategic advisor.

Selected discography

Studio albums

EPs

Singles

As lead artist

As featured artist

Songwriting and production

Nominations and awards

References

External links
Official website
XSET
How to Win Big in the Music Business
Dash Radio

1979 births
Living people
American DJs
American hip hop record producers
Musicians from Boston
People from Dorchester, Massachusetts